Daneja Grandovec (born 2 July 1984) is a Slovenian long-distance runner. She competes in marathons, steeplechase and mountain running.

In 2005, Grandovec finished sixth in the women's 3000 metres steeplechase at the 2005 European Athletics U23 Championships.

She has won the 2005 Ljubljana Marathon and the 2010 Three Hearts Marathon.

Grandovec finished 33rd at the women's marathon at the 2010 European Athletics Championships.

She finished 46th, as the last finisher, at the women's marathon at the 2013 World Championships in Athletics.

In 2015, she competed in the Valencia Marathon and finished with a time that is lower than the qualifying standard for the 2016 Olympics.

She has also competed in the European Mountain Running Championships.

References

1984 births
Living people
Slovenian female long-distance runners
Slovenian female marathon runners
Slovenian female steeplechase runners
World Athletics Championships athletes for Slovenia
Athletes (track and field) at the 2016 Summer Olympics
Olympic athletes of Slovenia